NA-209 Sanghar-I is a constituency for the National Assembly of Pakistan.

Election 2002 

General elections were held on 10 Oct 2002. Qazi Abdul Qudus Rajar of PML-F won by 61,671 votes.

Election 2008 

General elections were held on 18 Feb 2008. Ghulam Dastagir Rajar of PML-F won by 68,122 votes.

Election 2013 

General elections were held on 11 May 2013. Shazia Marri of PPP won and became the member of National Assembly.

Election 2018 

General elections are scheduled to be held on 25 July 2018.

See also
NA-208 Nawabshah-II
NA-210 Sanghar-II

References

External links 
Election result's official website

NA-235